Alexander John Graves (born July 23, 1965) is an American film director, television director, television producer and screenwriter.

Early life
Alex Graves was born in Kansas City, Missouri. His father, William Graves, was a reporter for The Kansas City Star and his mother, Alexandra "Sandy" Graves, worked for United States Senator Nancy Kassebaum of Kansas. His family moved to his father's home town of El Dorado, Kansas when he was young, when his father became a partner in the family drug store business. He graduated from El Dorado High School in 1983. Graves attended University of Kansas and the University of Southern California where he earned a BA Degree in Film Production.

Career
Graves began his work in television directing episodes of Ally McBeal, Sports Night and The Practice.

Graves is well known for his work directing 34 episodes of the series The West Wing, where he served as director, producer, supervising producer, co-executive producer, and ultimately executive producer. He won two Primetime Emmy Awards for his production work on that series. He was also nominated for the Emmy for his direction of the episodes "Posse Comitatus" and "2162 Votes." He was awarded the Humanitas Prize for his work on the episode "NSF Thurmont."

In 2006, he directed the pilot episode of The Nine for ABC, serving as an executive producer on the pilot. In 2007, he directed and executive produced the pilot, and directed several more episodes, of the drama Journeyman, which aired on NBC. In 2009, Graves was asked by J. J. Abrams to direct and executive produce the pilot of the Fox science-fiction series Fringe.

From 2010 to 2011, Graves worked for Steven Spielberg to direct and executive produce the pilot of the Fox adventure series Terra Nova. The series premiered September 26, 2011. In 2010, he directed and executive produced the ABC pilot The Whole Truth for Jerry Bruckheimer. This pilot also went on to become a series. In 2011, Graves directed a pilot for ABC entitled Poe, a re-imagining of the life of author Edgar Allan Poe, starring Natalie Dormer and Christopher Egan, which did not go to series. Graves then directed and executive produced the ABC pilot 666 Park Avenue.

In 2012, Graves directed Showtime's Shameless for John Wells before being asked by Aaron Sorkin to direct his new HBO series The Newsroom. Graves has directed six episodes of HBO's Game of Thrones.

In 2015, Graves was the executive producer of the supernatural medical television drama Proof on TNT.

In 2016, he was chosen as director for Sony's upcoming Mulan live-action remake.

In 2018, Graves directed two episodes of the Netflix original Altered Carbon.

In 2019, Graves directed one episode of the USA Network original Treadstone. In 2020, he directed the season 2 finale of The Boys.

References

External links
 

1965 births
Living people
Writers from Kansas City, Missouri
American film directors
American male screenwriters
American television directors
American television producers
Primetime Emmy Award winners
University of Kansas alumni
USC School of Cinematic Arts alumni
Screenwriters from Missouri